Genre is a 1996 animated meta-comedy short film by animator Don Hertzfeldt, his second 16mm student film, produced at the age of 19.

The 16mm short combines traditional animation, pixilation, and stop-motion animation to present a cartoon rabbit careening through a variety of rapidly changing film genres as his animator struggles to come up with a good idea.

Release

The cartoon received 17 awards from film festivals. In 1996 it screened nationwide in theaters as part of the Spike and Mike's Festival of Animation tour.

In 1997, it was shown on an episode of MTV's Cartoon Sushi.

In 2005, the original 16mm negative was digitally restored and remastered for the first time, for release on the extensive "Bitter Films Volume 1" DVD compilation of Hertzfeldt's 1995-2005 films.  Special features included for Genre were Hertzfeldt's original production sketches, notes, and deleted ideas from the film, as well as a very rare 1993 video short called "Escape is Still Impossible", a precursor to Genre that Don created while still in high school.

Production credits

 Written, Produced, Animated, and Directed by Don Hertzfeldt
 Camera by Cary Walker
 Editing and Sound by Kevyn Eiselt
 Music by Dave LaDelfa
 Stop Motion Assistance by Brian Hamblin
 Sound Production by Kevin Kelly

Reception
The film was very well received. It was praised by critics such as Felix Hude of the Melbourne International Film Festival and won 17 awards.

Awards

Best Short Film - UCSB Corwin-Metropolitan Theaters Award
First Place, Animation - UFVA Student Film Festival
The Lumiere Award - New Orleans Film Festival
First Place, Animated Short Subject New York Empire State Exhibitions
Most Promising Filmmaker - Sinking Creek Film Festival
Silver Plaque, Animation - Chicago International Film Festival
Second Place, Animation - Fort Lauderdale International Film Festival
Best Santa Barbara Filmmaker - Santa Barbara International Film Festival
Gold Medal, Best Animation - Carolina Film Festival
Audience Choice Award, Best Animated Short - Filmfest New Haven
Jury Award for Humor - Ann Arbor Film Festival
Jury Award - Surprise International Film Festival, Taiwan
Second Place, Student Animation - World Animation Celebration
Bronze Plaque - Columbus International Film Festival
Finalist Award - Worldfest Houston
Honorable Mention - Humboldt State Film Festival
Honorable Mention - Atlanta Film Festival

References

Short films directed by Don Hertzfeldt
1996 films
American student films
Animated films without speech
1996 short films
American films with live action and animation
American short films